The 2002 Bucknell Bison football team was an American football team that represented Bucknell University during the 2002 NCAA Division I-AA football season. Bucknell finished last in the Patriot League. 

Dave Kotulski, who had been Bucknell's defensive coordinator since 1995, took over as acting head coach in 2002 after Tom Gadd, who had been diagnosed with cancer in early 2001, stepped away from the team for health reasons.

In Kotulski's first and only year as head coach, the Bison compiled a 2–9 record. Gary Carruthers, Adam Lord and Todd Warmington were the team captains.

The Bison were outscored 251 to 163. Their winless (0–7) conference record placed last in the Patriot League standings. On the last weekend of October, the Bison became the first team to lose a Patriot League game to Georgetown, which had joined the league the previous year; at season's end, Bucknell became the first team to equal Georgetown by finishing in eighth place.

Toward the end of the year, with Gadd hospitalized, university officials announced that Gadd would not return in 2003, and the Bison would search for a replacement head coach. Gadd died in March 2003.

Bucknell played its home games at Christy Mathewson–Memorial Stadium on the university campus in Lewisburg, Pennsylvania.

Schedule

References

Bucknell
Bucknell Bison football seasons
Bucknell Bison football